The 1906 Indiana Hoosiers football team was an American football team that represented Indiana University Bloomington during the 1906 college football season. In their second season under head coach James M. Sheldon, the Hoosiers compiled a 4–2 record, finished in a tie for seventh place in the Western Conference, and outscored their opponents by a combined total of 109 to 46.

Schedule

References

Indiana
Indiana Hoosiers football seasons
Indiana Hoosiers football